Midweek is a Canadian public affairs television series which aired on CBC Television from 1971 to 1972.

Premise
This series was a companion episode of CBC's popular Sunday night Weekend public affairs series. It replaced the previous Saturday supplementary broadcast of Weekend. Hosts for each episode of Midweek were a selection of Clive Baxter, Michael Callaghan, Peter Desbarats, Pierre Nadeau and Kay Sigurjonsson. Journalists such as Doug Collins, Michael Maltby and Larry Zolf were featured in reports for this series.

Scheduling
This hour-long series was broadcast Thursdays at 10:00 p.m. (Eastern) from 30 September 1971 to 18 May 1972.

References

External links
 

CBC Television original programming
1971 Canadian television series debuts
1972 Canadian television series endings
Television news program articles using incorrect naming style